MALT (N-methyl-N-allyltryptamine or ''N,N''-methylallyltryptamine) is a lesser-known drug from the tryptamine family. It is a novel compound with very little history of human use.  It is closely related to methylpropyltryptamine (MPT), as well as N-methyltryptamine. It has been sold online as a designer drug.  Very little information on the pharmacology or toxicity of MALT is available.

Legality 
MALT is not explicitly scheduled in any countries; however, it could be considered a psychoactive substance under the UK Psychoactive Substances Act, which requires the prosecutor to prove that the substance is psychoactive in order for a person to be charged with an offense.

It could also be considered a structural analog of a scheduled substance under the US Federal Analogue Act due to its similarity to scheduled tryptamines.

See also 

 5-Methoxy-N,N-Methylallyltryptamine (5-MeO-MALT)
 N,N-Diallyltryptamine (DALT)
 Methylpropyltryptamine (MPT)

References

Further reading 

 
 

Tryptamines
Designer drugs
Allyl compounds